Valsa nivea is a plant pathogen infecting elms.

See also
 List of elm diseases

References

External links
 USDA ARS Fungal Database

Fungal tree pathogens and diseases
Diaporthales
Fungi described in 1787